Dzyadko is a Ukrainian surname.

People 

 Tikhon Dzyadko (born 1987), a Russian journalist, TV presenter, editor-in-chief of the Dozhd TV channel
  (born 1985), a Russian journalist, RBK editor
  (born 1982), a Russian journalist, editor-in-chief of the educational project Arzamas

References 

Ukrainian-language surnames